Nimburg is an unincorporated community in Butler County, Nebraska, United States.

History
A post office called Nimberg (with an E) operated from 1888 until 1895.

References

Unincorporated communities in Butler County, Nebraska
Unincorporated communities in Nebraska